The 2010–11 NBL season is the 12th season for the Cairns Taipans in the NBL.

Off-season

Additions

Subtractions

Roster

Regular season

Standings

Game log

|- style="background-color:#ffcccc;"
| 1
| 5 September
| Townsville
| L 76-79
|  
| 
| 
| Bendigo Bank Basketball Stadium
| 0-1
|- style="background-color:#bbffbb"
| 2
| 8 October
| Gold Coast
| W 103-67
|
|
|
| Bendigo Bank Basketball Stadium
| 1-1

|- style="background-color:#ffcccc;"
| 1
| 16 October
| @ Townsville
| L 70-79
| 
|
|
| Townsville Entertainment Centre  4,201
| 0-1
|- style="background-color:#bbffbb;"
| 2
| 23 October
| Adelaide
| W 85-74
| 
|
|
| Cairns Convention Centre  4,250
| 1-1
|- style="background-color:#ffcccc;"
| 3
| 29 October
| @ Gold Coast
| L 81-92
| 
|
|
| Gold Coast Convention Centre  2,946
| 1-2

|- style="background-color:#bbffbb;"
| 4
| 6 November
| Perth
| W 86-69
| 
|
|
| Cairns Convention Centre (CCC)  4,070
| 2-2
|- style="background-color:#bbffbb;"
| 5
| 13 November
| Gold Coast
| W 96-76
| 
|
|
| CCC  4,007
| 3-2
|- style="background-color:#bbffbb;"
| 6
| 20 November
| Adelaide
| W 87-71
| 
|
|
| CCC  4,920
| 4-2
|- style="background-color:#bbffbb;"
| 7
| 28 November
| @ Perth
| W 72-64
| 
|
|
| Challenge Stadium  4,000
| 5-2

|- style="background-color:#bbffbb;"
| 8
| 4 December
| Wollongong
| W 80-62
| 
|
|
| Cairns Convention Centre (CCC)  4,625
| 6-2
|- style="background-color:#ffcccc;"
| 9
| 9 December
| @ New Zealand
| L 79-93
| 
|
|
| North Shore Events Centre  TBA 
| 6-3
|- style="background-color:#"
| 10
| 18 December
| Townsville
| 
|  
| 
| 
| CCC  
| 
|- style="background-color:#"
| 11
| 31 December
| Sydney
| 
|  
| 
| 
| CCC 
| 
|-

Finals

Player statistics

Regular season

Finals

Awards

Player of the Week

Player of the Month

Coach of the Month

See also
 2010-11 NBL season
 Cairns Taipans

References

External links
 Official Website

Cairns
Cairns Taipans seasons